is a junction passenger railway station in the city of Ōamishirasato, Chiba Prefecture, Japan, operated by East Japan Railway Company (JR East).

Lines
Ōami Station is served by the Sotobō Line and Tōgane Line.

Station layout
The station has consists of two opposed side platforms serving the Sotobō Line tracks and a single island platform serving the Tōgane Line tracks. The station has a Midori no Madoguchi staffed ticket office.

Platforms

History
Ōami Station was opened on 20 January 1896, as the terminal station of the Bōsō Railway. The line was extended to Ichinomiya in 1897. The Tōgane Line began operations from 30 June 1900. On 1 September 1907, the Bōsō Railway was nationalized and became part of the Japanese Government Railways, which was transformed into the Japanese National Railways (JNR) after World War II. Freight operations were discontinued on 1 July 1971. On 27 May 1972, the station building was relocated to its present location, to eliminate the use of a switchback. The station was absorbed into the JR East network upon the privatization of JNR on 1 April 1987.

Passenger statistics
In fiscal 2019, the station was used by an average of 10,057 passengers daily (boarding passengers only).

Surrounding area
 Ōami City Hall
 Ōami High School
 Ōami Post Office

See also
 List of railway stations in Japan

References

External links

 JR East Station information 

Railway stations in Japan opened in 1897
Railway stations in Chiba Prefecture
Sotobō Line
Ōamishirasato